Nick Jonas & the Administration was a band formed in late 2009 as a side project by Nick Jonas of the Jonas Brothers. Performers included singer, pianist, guitarist, drummer, and songwriter Nick Jonas, bassist John Fields, drummer Michael Bland, keyboardist Tommy Barbarella, and guitarist David Ryan Harris. Sonny Thompson replaced David Ryan Harris during the 2010 Who I Am Tour. The group was named after Nick Jonas's interest in the presidency.

History

Group formation
"I had written five or six songs that were on my heart, things that were just pouring out of me with this new and exciting sound", said Jonas. "They weren't necessarily right for the Jonas Brothers, but I thought they could be perfect for something else."

The band was announced on the official MySpace page of the Jonas Brothers on October 30, stating it was just a "side project" and that this was not the end of the band. "I'm kind of modeling it after Bruce Springsteen & The E Street Band", Nick said. "It's kind of the look we were going for stylistically on the album cover and just the project in general… [Springsteen] pours so much passion and emotion into all of his songs every night and I hope I can capture that too."

The Administration members Michael Bland, Tommy Barbarella and Sonny Thompson formerly played together in Prince's New Power Generation from 1991 to 1996. All three were original members.

2009–2010: Who I Am

The first single of the album "Who I Am" was officially released on December 3, 2009, followed by the release of the music video.
The group made its live debut performing a single of the same name on the Grammy Nominations Concert Live special Dec. 2 on CBS.
Jonas cut the album in eight days with producer John Fields, who also played bass. The album has 9 new numbers and a cover of the Jonas Brothers single "Tonight". Nick originally wrote the song World War III for the administration, but instead it was used on the Jonas Brothers album Lines, Vines and Trying Times.  He also wrote a song called Oval Office but the songs never appeared on the record because according to Nick the song didn't sound good. "Rose Garden" was the first song written for the album and was partly inspired by a difficult break-up. 
Previews of the songs Olive & An Arrow, Last Time Around, State of Emergency, Stronger (Back on the Ground) and Vespers Goodbye were released online before the official album release. 
Their debut album Who I Am was  released February 2, 2010 as a Standard Edition (CD) and Limited Edition (CD+DVD) and reached number 3 on the Billboard 200 album chart, selling over 80,000 copies.
.
Nick promoted the album on February 2 during various mini live chats with Sonny Thompson. Nick performed with Sonny Thompson acoustic versions of the songs "Last Time Around", "Who I Am", "Tonight" during Radio Disney Total Access; he also promoted the album during TV performances.
Their single "Who I Am" was featured on Radio Disney Jams, Vol. 12, along with songs by other popular artists. Jams 12 was officially released on March 30, 2010.
As of May 2010, the album has sold over 151,000 copies in the U.S.

In January 2010, Nick Jonas & the Administration toured in support of their debut album, Who I Am.  Apart from guest appearances at specific events, it marks the first time Nick has toured without his brothers, Kevin and Joe. Kevin and Joe did appear on certain dates to sing a song with Nick. Frankie Jonas appeared on the last tour day. Diane Birch was the major support act of the tour.  The tour took place in small, intimate venues in the United States.
While on tour Nick Jonas and the Administration performed new songs such as "Stay" (which he wrote and recorded while he was on tour; he performed it after January 6), "I Do" (performed on the last day of tour) and "While the World Is Spinning", "A Lot of Love to Spill", they also performed remixes of the Jonas Brothers songs "Inseparable" and "Before the Storm"; at the end of the tour they recorded the video clips for the songs "Rose Garden" and "Stay". The tour began on January 2, in Dallas, Texas and ended January 30, in Berkeley, California.

On March 2, 2010, they released the song "Stay" as a digital single and a digital EP. Nick said that the song will not be on the record because he wrote it too late. He also said that "Stay" "is a song I wrote that day we had off in Washington. It came after some things that I was going through that really inspired it.. and I'm just in a good place right now and was able to get a song out of it, which is always nice."

2010: Jonas Brothers Live in Concert World Tour 2010

While announcing Nick Jonas' side-project Nick Jonas and the Administration, the brothers announced they were planning a world tour to take place during the summer of 2010. As of August 7, 2010, Nick Jonas performs "Who I Am" without the members of the Administration during the North American leg of the Jonas Brothers Live In Concert tour. During the performance of the song he often stops and gives a speech. On August 28, 2010, in Atlantic City Nick performs "Rose Garden". The next day (August 29, 2010), he performed "Stay" on tour during a concert in Virginia Beach. And on September 18, Nick performed two songs: "Who I Am" and "Last Time Around" during a concert in Mountain View, CA.

There was an announcement that Nick Jonas & the Administration will be opening for the Jonas Brothers Live In Concert tour during the concerts in South America. Soon after the announcement the Jonas Brothers released a statement where they denied that Nick Jonas & the Administration will be opening during the South America concerts.
On October 15, he performed "Who I Am" during the concerts in South America. During the concert in Porto Alegre (Brazil) on 10 November, he performed "Rose Garden" before "Who I Am".

Other songs he performs solo during the both legs of the tour are "Introducing Me" and sometimes "A Little Bit Longer" and "Black Keys" .

On October 18, 2010, Nick Jonas & The Administration appeared on the submission list for the Grammy Awards 5 times.

2011: Promotional concerts & Touring
 
On February 23, 2011, Nick held a free acoustic set, accompanied by Jonas Brothers guitarist and musical director John Taylor. Nick asked the fans to create their own version of a setlist, in a contest through Twitter.
He performed songs from his solo album, Jonas Brothers songs and a new song London Foolishly, which he wrote during his stay in London for the musical, Les Misérables. Along With Sonny Thompson Nick performed at the Military Event in Columbus, Ohio on April 14, 2011. He played the songs Last Time Around and Who I Am.

On July 1, Nick performed during the Microsoft Store Grand Opening in Century City. He performed songs of his solo album, as well as cover songs and Jonas Brothers songs.
The American singer Jasmine Villegas opened for him.

On July 16, 2011, the band performed at the Cisco Bluesfest in Ottawa, Canada.
And on August 13 they are set to perform at Musikfest. The concert was cancelled in the middle of Nick's performance (about 1 hour into the setlist) due to severe weather.

On October 1, they are set to perform in Buenos Aires at the Estadio G.E.B.A.
On July 12 Nick announced through Facebook that there will more shows in South America.
On July 14 Nick announced a concert in Chile on October 4.
On July 21 he announced a concert in Paraguay
He announced a second concert in Argentine on July 22.
On August 2 Nick confirmed five concerts in Brazil and one in Venezuela.
On August 5, 2011, there was an announcement from Nick through his Facebook page about a concert in Uruguay.

On September 3, 2011, nick announced through Twitter that Ocean Grove Band will be going on tour with them. On September 6, a concert in Puerto Rico was announced.
On September 21, the first day of the tour, it was announced that Jonas' last concert date of the tour (San Juan, Puerto Rico on October 11) was cancelled. The producer of the Puerto Rico date, César Sainz, confirmed the information the same day. Nick's reason to cancel the last show was that his training for the role of J. Pierrepont Finch, which will replace Harry Potter actor Daniel Radcliffe and Glee's Darren Criss, in the revival of Broadway's How to Succeed in Business Without Really Trying will take place in Los Angeles starting on October 10. On September 23, the news was confirmed via Nick Jonas' website.

On December 13, 2011, a video of Nick performing Last Time Around was posted online as part of a new internet serie Fandrop. The video shows some lucky fans seeing Nick Jonas & the administration rehearse for the Nick jonas 2011 Tour.
On December 14 a teaser for the next episode went online, it shows Nick talking about Conspiracy Theory. The second episode will premiere December 15, 2011
On December 15 the second episode went online it shows the performance of Conspiracy Theory by Nick Jonas & the Administration.
On December 16 a teaser for the next episode went online, it shows Nick playing the intro of Who I Am. This episode will premiere December 20, 2011
On December 20, the episode was online, it shows Nick performing Who I Am. Alongside a teaser for episode 4 went online, it shows Nick warming up his vocals for the last episode; which airs December 22, 2011.
On December 22, the last episode airs, it shows Nick Jonas & the Administration performing their version of the Jonas Brothers song Inseparable.

2012–2016: Leaving Label, Jonas Brothers Tours, hiatus, reunion
It was announced on May 2, 2012, that the Nick Jonas part ways with their record label Hollywood Records; he bought the rights of their music. On May 20, 2012, Nick performed an acoustic version of the songs Who I Am and Last Time Around in a six-song acoustic set between two shows of How to Succeed in Business Without Really Trying.

The songs "Who I Am" & "Last Time Around" were performed during all of the Jonas Brothers World Tour 2012/2013.
During the concert in Monterrey Mexico the songs  "Stay" and "State of Emergency" were also performed. Stay was performed again in Rio de Janeiro on March 12, 2013.
The songs "Who I Am" & "Last Time Around" were performed again as part of the main setlist during  the Jonas Brothers Live Tour. On July 29, Stay was also performed and on July 30 Vesper's Goodbye. On July 31, Stay was performed with Sonny Thompson.

On August 31, 2016, Jonas announced that the band would reunite for a one night only concert in Minneapolis, Minnesota on the same day. The show quickly sold out in less than two hours. The band performed every song from their debut album along with Stay and Inseparable from 2007's Jonas Brothers.

Band members
Current members
 Nick Jonas - lead vocals, rhythm guitar, drums, piano (since 2009)
 John Fields - bass, backing vocals (since 2009)
 Michael Bland - drums, percussion, backing vocals (since 2009)
 Tommy Barbarella - synthesizers, keyboards (since 2009)
 Sonny Thompson - lead guitar, backing vocals (since 2009)

Former members
 David Ryan Harris - lead guitar, backing vocals (2009)

Touring members
 Chris Bailey - drums (2011)
 Joshua Dunham - rhythm guitar, lead guitar (2011)
 Marcus Kincy -  keyboards (2011)

Discography

Studio albums

Live albums

Extended plays

Singles

Music videos

Other appearances

Tours
Who I Am Tour (2010)
2011 Tour (2011)

Filmography

Awards and nominations

The Teen Choice Awards is an annual awards show established in 1999 by the Fox Broadcasting Company. Nick Jonas & the Administration have received 2 nominations.

See also
 List of songs by Nick Jonas & the Administration
 Jonas Brothers
 Tonight
 Rose Garden
 Stay
 Who I Am
 Last Time Around

Notes

References

External links
 

 
Nick Jonas
Musical groups established in 2009
Hollywood Records artists
Musical groups from Los Angeles
American blues rock musical groups
American pop rock music groups